Brachystele guayanensis is a species of orchid. It is native to southern Mexico, Central America (Costa Rica, El Salvador, Guatemala and Honduras), Trinidad & Tobago, and northern South America (Colombia, Venezuela, Guyana, Suriname, French Guiana, Bolivia, northern Brazil).

References

External links 

Swiss Orchid Foundation at the Herbarium Jany Renz

Orchids of Mexico
Orchids of Central America
Orchids of South America
Flora of Trinidad and Tobago
Spiranthinae
Plants described in 1840
Flora without expected TNC conservation status